Santiago Rodríguez-Miranda Gómez (born 1940) is a Spanish politician who served as Minister of Labour and Social Security from December 1981 to December 1982.

References

1940 births
Living people
University of Barcelona alumni
Government ministers of Spain
20th-century Spanish politicians
Labour ministers of Spain